Club Deportivo Ibiza Islas Pitiusas, known as Ibiza Islas Pitiusas, Ibiza IP or simply Ibiza, is a Spanish football team based in Ibiza Town, in the autonomous community of the Balearic Islands. Founded in 2012, it plays in Segunda División RFEF – Group 3, holding home matches at Estadi Municipal de Can Misses, with a capacity of 4,500 seats.

Season to season

1 season in Segunda División RFEF
3 seasons in Tercera División

References

Football clubs in the Balearic Islands
Sport in Ibiza
Association football clubs established in 2012
2012 establishments in Spain